Govan (Ward 5) is one of the 23 wards of Glasgow City Council. Since its creation in 2007 it has returned four council members, using the single transferable vote system. The ward's size became smaller for the 2017 Glasgow City Council election, but it continued to return four councillors.

Boundaries
Located south of the River Clyde, as well as central Govan (once a separate burgh which includes the neighbourhoods of Drumoyne, Ibrox, Linthouse and Plantation) the ward also includes the areas of Shieldhall, Cessnock, Kinning Park, Kingston and Tradeston. The boundaries were changed in 2017, with the Bellahouston, Craigton and Dumbreck neighbourhoods south of the Inverclyde Line railway being reassigned to the Pollokshields ward.

The ethnic makeup of the Govan ward using the 2011 census population statistics was:

84.1% White Scottish / British / Irish / Other
10.9% Asian (mainly Pakistani)
3.8% Black (mainly African)
1.1% Mixed / Other Ethnic Group

Councillors

Election Results

2022 Election
2022 Glasgow City Council election

2017 Election
2017 Glasgow City Council election

2012 Election
2012 Glasgow City Council election

2013 by-election

2007 Election
2007 Glasgow City Council election

See also
Wards of Glasgow

References

External links
Listed Buildings in Govan Ward, Glasgow City at British Listed Buildings

Wards of Glasgow
Govan